This is a list of costliest Atlantic hurricanes, with US$1 billion (nominal) in property damage, broadly capturing the severity of the damage each tropical cyclone has caused. The list includes tropical storms, a tropical cyclone with a peak 1-minute maximum sustained wind in the range of 39–73 mph (63–118 km/h), placing them below the 74 mph (119 km/h) minimum needed to attain hurricane status.

History

The record of the costliest tropical cyclone in the Atlantic is held jointly by hurricanes Katrina (2005) and Harvey (2017), both of which resulted in approximately $125 billion in property damage during the year they occurred. These storms are also the costliest tropical cyclones recorded worldwide. The hurricane seasons of those two hurricanes, the 2005 and 2017 Atlantic hurricane seasons, are also the two costliest hurricane seasons recorded.

Most of the costliest Atlantic hurricanes in recorded history have peaked as major hurricanes. However, weaker tropical cyclones can still cause widespread damage. Tropical storms Alberto in 1994, Allison in 2001, Lee in 2011, Imelda in 2019 and Fred of 2021 each caused over a billion dollars in damage.

Flooding typically accounts for about 60% of all of a storm's damages, and this is reflected in the list with Harvey, Florence, and most recently Ida, which produced catastrophic rainfall; and with Katrina, Ike,  Sandy, and Ian which produced devastating storm surges. Wind damage encompasses a large portion of storm damage as well, evidenced by Andrew, Irma, and Michael. Due to their excessive damage, the names of tropical cyclones accruing at least $1 billion in damage are usually retired by the World Meteorological Organization, but this is not always the case. Juan in 1985 was the first hurricane to cause at least a billion in damage and not be retired; its name was retired after a later usage (2003) that did not cause over a billion in damage. Since Juan, nine tropical cyclones that caused at least a billion in damage were not retired, the most notable of which being Sally in 2020 which caused at least $7.3 billion, the costliest storm not to have its name retired.

The first hurricane to cause at least $1 billion in damage was Betsy in 1965, which caused much of its damage in southeastern Louisiana. Four years later, Camille caused over $1 billion in damage as it ravaged Louisiana and Mississippi at landfall, and Virginia after moving inland. After the 1960s, each decade saw an increase in tropical cyclones causing at least a billion in damage over the last, due to increasing urban development and population. In the 1970s, four hurricanes caused at least a billion in damage; the costliest of which was Agnes, which caused $2.1 billion in damage. The following decade featured seven hurricanes causing at least a billion in damage. In the 1990s, twelve tropical cyclones accrued at least a billion in damage, including Hurricane Andrew in 1992. The system greatly exceeded the damage figure of any preceding tropical cyclone, causing $27.3 billion in damage, mostly in South Florida. Nineteen tropical cyclones in the 2000s caused at least $1 billion in damage. The 2005 season had six billion-dollar hurricanes, the most of any season on record; this record was later surpassed in 2020, with eight billion-dollar hurricanes. Hurricanes Ivan (2004) and Irma (2017) caused at least $1 billion in damage in four separate countries. In the 2010s, twelve storms caused at least $1 billion in damage. Hanna was the first storm of the 2020s to become a billion dollar disaster.

Methodology 

This list ranks tropical cyclones within the Atlantic that have accrued at least US$1 billion in damage, based on their nominal USD damage totals. Furthermore, the figures have not been adjusted for changes in population and wealth in coastal counties, making it hard to accurately compare the damage inflicted by hurricanes over time.

In 2018, Roger A. Pielke Jr. and Christopher Landsea published a peer-reviewed study in the scientific journal Nature Sustainability,  which gave an estimate of the direct economic losses in the continental United States from 1900 to 2017 from each hurricane if that same event was to occur under contemporary (2017) societal conditions. The general formula for normalized losses  is

where  is reported damage in current-year US dollars,  is the GDP deflator for inflation adjustment,  is an estimate of current-cost net stock of fixed assets and consumer durable goods to capture changes in real wealth per-capita, and  county population adjustment.

As the results of the Pielke / Landsea study do not extend beyond 2017, the column for normalized damage, shown in the list, is not available beyond that year.

Overall costliest 

 indicates that the storm's impact in that season did not result in its name being retired

See also

 List of Atlantic hurricane records
 List of deadliest tropical cyclones
 List of Pacific hurricanes
 List of tropical cyclones
 Template:Costliest U.S. Atlantic hurricanes

References

Costliest
Costliest hurricanes, Atlantic